The discography of all albums and singles released by Hank Williams Jr. consists of 56 studio albums and 25 compilation albums. He has released 109 singles and 24 music videos. Eleven of his singles have reached Number One in either the United States or Canada.

Studio albums

1960s

1970s

1980s

1990s

2000s–2020s

Compilation albums

1960s–1970s

1980s–1990s

2000s–2010s

Singles

1960s

1970s

1980s

1990s

2000s and 2010s

Other singles

Singles from collaboration albums

Guest singles

Charted B-sides

Music videos

References 

Country music discographies
Rock music discographies
Discographies of American artists